Aleksandria Niedziałowska  is a village in the administrative district of Gmina Rejowiec, within Chełm County, Lublin Voivodeship, in eastern Poland.

The village has a population of 170.

References

Villages in Chełm County